Çamlıkule is a proposed underground station and the eastern terminus of the Üçyol—Çamlıkule Line of the İzmir Metro. It will be located beneath 220/39th Street in Çamlıkule, Buca. Construction of the station, along with the metro line, is expected to begin in 2020. 

Çamlıkule station is expected to open in 2024.

References

İzmir Metro
Railway stations scheduled to open in 2024
Rapid transit stations under construction in Turkey